Abdelkarim Kissi (born 5 May 1980) is a Moroccan former professional footballer who played as a midfielder.

Career 
Kissi's former teams are Mouloudia Oujda, Maghreb Fez, Rubin Kazan, Litex Lovech, SC Heerenveen, Enosis Neon Paralimni and Apollon Limassol. From April 2007, he played for the Bulgarian club Beroe Stara Zagora.

Trivia 
Kissi was also part of the Moroccan national squad that took part in the Africa Cup of Nations in Ghana.

External links
 

1980 births
Living people
Moroccan footballers
Moroccan expatriate footballers
Morocco international footballers
2004 African Cup of Nations players
2008 Africa Cup of Nations players
MC Oujda players
FC Rubin Kazan players
Russian Premier League players
PFC Litex Lovech players
SC Heerenveen players
PFC Beroe Stara Zagora players
Enosis Neon Paralimni FC players
Apollon Limassol FC players
AEK Larnaca FC players
Ermis Aradippou FC players
Ethnikos Achna FC players
First Professional Football League (Bulgaria) players
Eredivisie players
Cypriot First Division players
Expatriate footballers in Bulgaria
Expatriate footballers in Cyprus
Expatriate footballers in the Netherlands
Expatriate footballers in Russia
Moroccan expatriate sportspeople in Bulgaria
Moroccan expatriate sportspeople in the Netherlands
Moroccan expatriate sportspeople in Russia
People from Oujda
Association football midfielders
Wydad de Fès players
Moroccan expatriate sportspeople in Cyprus